The Convair Submersible Seaplane (or "Subplane") was a United States Navy project to produce a seaplane which could travel underwater as well as fly.

Between 1962 and 1964, the Navy granted a contract to Convair, a military aircraft  arm of General Dynamics, to design and develop the vehicle, intended for anti-submarine warfare. The craft's operational deployment would be to scout for enemy submarines from the air and, when detected, land on the water, submerge, and engage them underwater. One envisioned deployment was to attack shipping in the Soviet Union's marginal seas – the Baltic, Black, and Caspian seas.  
  

Convair's design was for a narrow-hulled flying boat (rather than a floatplane). The craft was to have used ballast tanks to dive and surface, much as a conventional submarine does, located in the wings and fuselage. The weaponry was to be torpedoes or mines. For undersea operations, the turbojets would be sealed water-tight, and underwater propulsion would be provided by a battery-powered electric motor driving a propeller.

Convair made detailed designs and built scale models which were tested, and averred that the craft would work, but the project did not get beyond that stage and was cancelled by Congress in 1965 or 1966.

References

Abandoned military projects of the United States
Cancelled military aircraft projects of the United States